Akçakavak is a village in the Gölpazarı District, Bilecik Province, Turkey. Its population is 63 (2021).

References

Villages in Gölpazarı District
Geography of Bilecik Province